Stig Nyström (25 November 1919 – 31 July 1983) was a Swedish footballer who played for IK Brage and Djurgårdens IF.  He also made 11 appearances and scored five goals for the Swedish national team. He was also part of Sweden's squad for the football tournament at the 1948 Summer Olympics, but he did not play in any matches.

References

Swedish footballers
1919 births
1983 deaths
Allsvenskan players
IK Brage players
Djurgårdens IF Fotboll players
Sweden international footballers
Association football forwards